The 2022 UNAF U-20 Tournament was the 15th edition of the UNAF U-20 Tournament. The tournament took place in Egypt, from 18 to 24 October 2022. The tournament also served as the qualifiers for the 2023 Africa U-20 Cup of Nations.

Participants
Egypt qualified as a hosts of the 2023 Africa U-20 Cup of Nations and did not take part to the tournament. The 4 participating teams were:

Venues

Squads

Tournament

Matches

Champion

Statistics

Goalscorers

References

External links
تصفيات منطقة اتحاد شمال افريقيا المؤهلة الى نهائيات كاس امم افريقيا تحت 20 عاما - UNAF official website

2022 in African football
UNAF U-20 Tournament
UNAF U-20 Tournament